Mellera is a genus of flowering plants belonging to the family Acanthaceae.

Its native range is Ethiopia to Southern Tropical Africa, and Madagascar.

Species
Species:

Mellera briartii 
Mellera calcarata 
Mellera congdonii 
Mellera insignis 
Mellera lobulata 
Mellera menthiodora 
Mellera nyassana 
Mellera submutica

References

Acanthaceae
Acanthaceae genera